The Speeding Venus is a 1926 American silent drama film directed by Robert Thornby and starring Priscilla Dean, Robert Frazer and Dale Fuller.

Cast
 Priscilla Dean as Emily Dale 
 Robert Frazer as John Steele 
 Dale Fuller as Midge Rooney 
 Johnny Fox as Speck O'Donnell 
 Ray Ripley as Chet Higgins 
 Charles Sellon as Jed Morgan

References

Bibliography
 Munden, Kenneth White. The American Film Institute Catalog of Motion Pictures Produced in the United States, Part 1. University of California Press, 1997.

External links

1926 films
1926 drama films
Silent American drama films
Films directed by Robert Thornby
American silent feature films
1920s English-language films
Producers Distributing Corporation films
American black-and-white films
1920s American films